The Interstate Highways in Illinois are all segments of the Interstate Highway System that are owned and maintained by the U.S. state of Illinois. The Illinois Department of Transportation (IDOT), Illinois State Toll Highway Authority (ISTHA), and Skyway Concession Company (SCC) are responsible for maintaining these highways in Illinois. The Interstate Highway System in Illinois consists of 13 primary highways and 11 auxiliary highways which cover .

Primary Interstate Highways

Auxiliary Interstate Highways

Business loops

See also

References

 
Interstate